The 2013–14 Montenegrin Cup was the eighth season of the Montenegrin knockout football tournament. The winner of the tournament received a berth in the first qualifying round of the 2014–15 UEFA Europa League. The defending champions were Budućnost, who beat Čelik in the final of the 2012–13 competition. The competition featured 30 teams. It started on 17 September 2013 and ended with the final on 21 May 2014.

First round
The 14 matches in this round were played on 17 and 18 September 2013.

Summary

|}

Matches

Second round
The 14 winners from the first round and last year's cup finalists, Budućnost and Čelik, compete in this round. Starting with this round, all rounds of the competition were two-legged except for the final.  The first legs were on 2 October 2013, while the second legs were on 23 October 2013.

Summary

|}

First legs

Second legs

Quarter-finals
The eight winners from the Second Round competed in this round. The first legs took place on 6 November 2013 and the second legs took place on 27 November 2013.

Summary

|}

First legs

Second legs

Semi-finals
The four winners from the quarter-finals competed in this round. The first legs took place on 9 April 2014 and the second legs took place on 30 April 2014.

Summary

|}

First legs

Second legs

Final

References

External links
Montenegrin Cup 2013-2014 at Football Association of Montenegro's official site
Montenegrin Cup 2013-2014 at Soccerway

Montenegrin Cup seasons
Montenegrin Cup
Cup